Bazèga is one of the 45 provinces of Burkina Faso and is in Centre-Sud Region. The capital of Bazèga is Kombissiri. Bazèga had a population of 238,202 in 2006 and in 2011 it was estimated to be 263,603.

Education
In 2011 the province had 187 primary schools and 23 secondary schools.

Healthcare
In 2011 the province had 37 health and social promotion centers (Centres de santé et de promotion sociale), 7 doctors and 109 nurses.

Departments
Bazèga is divided into 7 departments:

See also
Regions of Burkina Faso
Provinces of Burkina Faso
Communes of Burkina Faso

References 

 
Provinces of Burkina Faso